Charith Mendis (born 10 November 1995) is a Sri Lankan cricketer. He made his Twenty20 debut for Kurunegala Youth Cricket Club in the 2017–18 SLC Twenty20 Tournament on 25 February 2018. He made his List A debut for Kurunegala Youth Cricket Club in the 2017–18 Premier Limited Overs Tournament on 10 March 2018.

References

External links
 

1995 births
Living people
Sri Lankan cricketers
Kurunegala Youth Cricket Club cricketers
Place of birth missing (living people)